Trinity Baptiste is an American professional basketball player. She was drafted by the Indiana Fever in the 2021 WNBA draft but was waived by the team before the start of the season.

Baptiste grew up in Tampa, Florida. She attended Hillsborough High School. She was named a McDonald's All-American in 2016.

Baptiste started her college career at Northwest Florida State College. She appeared in 31 games and averaged 13 points per game on a 61% field goal percentage. She also averaged 8.3 rebounds.

She transferred to Virginia Tech for her sophomore season. She appeared in 64 games for the Hokies and started 26. At Virginia Tech, she recorded 12 double-doubles. She was named ACC Sixth Player of the Year in 2020 and was named to the ACC All-Academic Team.

Baptiste joined the University of Arizona as a graduate transfer after the 2020 season. She started all 27 games at Arizona, where she averaged 26.4 minutes, 8.6 points, and 6.1 rebounds. Baptiste lead Arizona to an appearance in the championship game in the 2021 NCAA Division 1 Women's Basketball tournament.

Baptiste decided to forgo her remaining eligibility, of which she had an extra year due to the coronavirus pandemic, and declare for the WNBA Draft in spring 2021.

References 

Living people
American women's basketball players
Arizona Wildcats women's basketball players
Virginia Tech Hokies women's basketball players
Year of birth missing (living people)
Indiana Fever draft picks